The 2006 Monmouth Hawks football team represented Monmouth University in the 2006 NCAA Division I FCS football season as a member of the Northeast Conference (NEC). The Hawks were led by 14th-year head coach Kevin Callahan and played their home games at Kessler Field. They finished the season 10–2 overall and 6–1 in NEC play to win the conference championship. As the team with the best record in the NEC, they were invited to participate in the Gridiron Classic, which they lost 27–7 to San Diego.

Schedule

References

Monmouth
Monmouth Hawks football seasons
Northeast Conference football champion seasons
Monmouth Hawks football